Sanath Ranjan (born 18 February 1986) is a Sri Lankan cricketer. He made his List A debut for Vauniya District in the 2016–17 Districts One Day Tournament on 19 March 2017. He made his Twenty20 debut for Police Sports Club in the 2018–19 SLC Twenty20 Tournament on 15 February 2019.

References

External links
 

1986 births
Living people
Sri Lankan cricketers
Sri Lanka Police Sports Club cricketers
Vauniya District cricketers
Place of birth missing (living people)